Izet Haračić (16 July 1965 – 1 September 2015) was a Bosnian bobsledder. He competed in the four-man event at the 1994 Winter Olympics.

References

1965 births
2015 deaths
Bosnia and Herzegovina male bobsledders
Olympic bobsledders of Bosnia and Herzegovina
Bobsledders at the 1994 Winter Olympics
Sportspeople from Sarajevo